Erna Raabe, Dame von Holzhausen (1882-1938) was a German artist; known for portraits and animal paintings.

Biography 
She studied at the Städelschule in Frankfurt am Main, from 1900 to 1902. Her primary instructor there was Wilhelm Trübner. After graduating, she took a trip to Italy, during which she developed a close relationship with her fellow artist, Käthe Loewenthal. In 1903, she settled in Stuttgart, where she continued her studies with Heinrich Altherr at the State Academy of Fine Arts.

In 1909, Loewenthal moved there. They lived together after 1914. Sometime around 1925, they took an extended trip to China and Japan.

In the mid 1930s, she became seriously ill. Loewenthal cared for her and kept her paintings hidden from the Nazis. Raabe's feelings about National Socialism were never openly expressed, although the fact that Loewenthal was Jewish would certainly suggest that she was not a supporter.

She succumbed to her illness in the resort city of Greifswald in 1938.

References

Further reading 
  "Erna Raabe von Holzhausen", In: Hans Dieter Mück, Stuttgarter Sezession – Ausstellungen 1923–1932, Städtische Galerie Böblingen and Galerie Schlichtenmaier Grafenau, Grafik Druck GmbH Stuttgart, 1987,  pg.164

1882 births
1938 deaths
People from Opava
20th-century German women artists